Juan Carlos Ferrero was the defender of championship title; however, he chose to not participate this year.
Stanislas Wawrinka defeated Victor Hănescu in the final 6–2, 6–3.

Seeds
The top four seeds receive a bye into the second round.

Draw

Finals

Top half

Bottom half

Qualifying

Seeds

Qualifiers

Draw

First qualifier

Second qualifier

Third qualifier

Fourth qualifier

External links
 Main Draw
 Qualifying Singles

Grand Prix Hassan II - Singles
- Singles, 2010 Grand Prix Hassan Ii